TokenEx is a cloud-based data security company, headquartered in Tulsa, Oklahoma. The company was founded in 2010 by Alex Pezold. It provides services for coupling tokenization (data security), encryption, and key management for ensuring secure data. It specializes in the tokenization (data security) of sensitive customer data. Pezold said tokenization can translate “30 million credit card numbers into 30 million tokens,” in a very short time. The World Vision International is one of its clients using TokenEx platform.

On 28 February 2018, the company announced its partnership with Cloud Constellation to design a space-based data security solution that layers tokenization, and secure storage in space for securing customers' sensitive data.

It won the 2016 Metro 50 Award and was recognized as the Metro 50’s fastest growing privately held company by the Greater Oklahoma City Chamber.

See also

Oklahoma Center for the Advancement of Science and Technology
RSA Security

References

Computer security companies
Software companies based in Oklahoma
Software companies established in 2010
Former certificate authorities
2010 establishments in Oklahoma
Security companies of the United States
Software companies of the United States